Sisilia Seavula (born November 15, 1995) is a Fijian sprinter. She competed at the 2016 Summer Olympics in the Women's 100 metres event. She progressed from the first preliminary round with a time of 12.34 seconds. In the quarterfinal round, Seavula finished with a time of 12.48 seconds. She did not advance to the semifinals. She attended  St Joseph's Secondary School, Fiji where she won the blue ribbon event in the 100m.

Personal Bests

References

External links

 Athletics Profile

1995 births
Living people
Fijian female sprinters
Athletes (track and field) at the 2016 Summer Olympics
Olympic athletes of Fiji
I-Taukei Fijian people